"It's One of Those Nights (Yes Love)" is a song written by Tony Romeo and was recorded by The Partridge Family for their 1972 album, Shopping Bag. The song went to number 2 on the Adult Contemporary chart and reached number 20 on The Billboard Hot 100 in 1972 .

The song went to number 9 in Canada in January 1972, number 11 in the United Kingdom in February of the year, and number 25 in Australia in March 1972.

The B-side to the single was "One Night Stand" written by Paul Anka and Wes Farrell.

"It's One of Those Nights" was very popular in Chicago, where it reached number seven on the WLS survey.

Chart history

Weekly charts

Year-end charts

Cover versions
David Cassidy on his 2001 album, Then and Now

References

1972 singles
The Partridge Family songs
Songs written by Tony Romeo
1972 songs
Bell Records singles
Song recordings produced by Wes Farrell